Marcelo Rui Dias d'Orey Branco (born Rio de Janeiro, Brazil, 7 March 1976) is a Portuguese former rugby union player. Professionally, he's a lawyer.

His position in the field is as a lock, but he has also played as number 8.

He played his entire career in CDUP, where he won 2 National CUPs, in 2002/2003 and 2005/2006.

D'Orey is one of the most capped Portuguese rugby footballers, with 60 caps and 5 tries, 25 points in aggregate, since his debut, at 10 November 1996, in a 20-31 loss to Spain.

D'Orey was selected for the squad that entered the 2007 Rugby World Cup. He got injured in his only presence, at the loss to New Zealand (13-108), in the first time the two teams played, missing the rest of the tournament. That would be his last game for the National Team.

External links
Marcello d'Orey International Statistics

1976 births
Living people
Sportspeople from Rio de Janeiro (city)
Portuguese rugby union players
Brazilian rugby union players
Brazilian emigrants to Portugal
Rugby union locks
Portugal international rugby union players